Cirrhicera leuconota is a species of beetle in the family Cerambycidae. It was described by Laporte in 1840. It is known from Mexico and Honduras.

References

Hemilophini
Beetles described in 1840